Cercanías San Sebastián (in Basque Renfe Aldiriak - Donostia) is a double track electrified commuter railway service provided by Renfe Operadora serving the city of San Sebastián in the Basque Country in northern Spain. It complements the San Sebastián Metro network and serves six million passengers a year.

Route
This railway service uses the Madrid–Hendaye railway line, serving 30 stations over 80.5 km of track. Interchange with Euskotren's San Sebastián Metro (Euskotren Trena) is provided at four stations.

References

External links 

Cercanías
Transport in Spain
Rail transport in the Basque Country (autonomous community)